The 1979 Canarian Island Cabildo elections were held on Tuesday, 3 April 1979, to elect the 1st Island Cabildos of El Hierro, Fuerteventura, Gran Canaria, La Gomera, La Palma, Lanzarote and Tenerife. All 137 seats in the seven Island Cabildos were up for election. The elections were held simultaneously with local elections all throughout Spain.

Overall

Island Cabildo control
The following table lists party control in the Island Cabildos.

Islands

El Hierro

Fuerteventura

Gran Canaria

Distribution by constituency

La Gomera

La Palma

Distribution by constituency

Lanzarote

Tenerife

Distribution by constituency

See also
Results breakdown of the 1979 Spanish local elections (Canary Islands)

References

Canary Islands
1979